Victor Harold Krulak (January 7, 1913 – December 29, 2008) was a decorated United States Marine Corps officer who saw action in World War II, Korea and Vietnam. Krulak, considered a visionary by fellow Marines, was the author of First to Fight: An Inside View of the U.S. Marine Corps and the father of the 31st Commandant of the Marine Corps, General Charles C. Krulak.

Personal life
Krulak was born in Denver, Colorado, to Jewish parents, Bessie (Zall) and Morris Krulak. He later denied Jewish ancestry and claimed to have been raised Episcopalian. He was married to Amy Chandler from 1936 until her death in 2004. The couple had three children.

Marine Corps career
Krulak was commissioned a United States Marine Corps second lieutenant upon graduation from the United States Naval Academy on May 31, 1934. Of diminutive stature, to receive his commission Krulak received an exemption; he was nevertheless a keen wrestler while at the Naval Academy, earning the nickname "Brute".  In 1936, Lt. Krulak was coxswain in Navy's unsuccessful eight-man boat at the Olympic trials in Princeton, NJ.

His early Marine Corps service included sea duty aboard USS Arizona, an assignment at the United States Naval Academy; duty with the 6th Marines in San Diego and the 4th Marines in China (1937–39); completion of the Junior School, Quantico, Virginia (1940); and an assignment with the 1st Marine Brigade, FMF, later the 1st Marine Division.

While stationed as an observer in Shanghai during the Second Sino-Japanese War in 1937, Krulak took photographs with a telephoto lens of a ramp-bowed landing boat that the Japanese had been using. Recognizing the potential use of such a craft by the U.S. armed forces, Krulak sent details and photographs back to Washington, but discovered years later that they had been filed away as having come from "some nut out in China". Krulak built a model of the Japanese boat design and discussed the retractable ramp approach with boat builder Andrew Higgins who incorporated elements of Krulak's input into the Landing Craft, Vehicle, Personnel (LCVP) or "Higgins boat", which played critical roles in the Normandy Landings and amphibious assaults in the Pacific.

World War II
At the outbreak of World War II, Krulak was a captain serving as aide to General Holland M. Smith, the commanding general, Amphibious Corps, Atlantic Fleet.  He volunteered for parachute training and on completion of training, he was ordered to the Pacific area as commander of the 2nd Parachute Battalion, 1st Marine Amphibious Corps. He went into action at Vella Lavella with the New Zealanders.

As a lieutenant colonel in the fall of 1943, he earned the Navy Cross and the Purple Heart on Choiseul Island, where his battalion staged a week-long diversionary raid to cover the Bougainville invasion. Later, he joined the newly formed 6th Marine Division and took part in the Okinawa campaign and the surrender of Japanese forces in the China area, earning the Legion of Merit with "V" device for valor and the Bronze Star.

The navy PT boat PT-59, captained by John F. Kennedy, helped evacuate Krulak's force from Choiseul at the end of the operation.  In response, Krulak promised Kennedy a bottle of whiskey which he delivered almost 20 years later when Kennedy was serving as President of the United States.

After the war, Krulak returned to the United States and served as assistant director of the Senior School at Marine Corps Base Quantico, and, later, as regimental commander of the 5th Marines at Camp Pendleton.

Korean War
Krulak was serving as assistant chief of staff, G-3, Fleet Marine Force, Pacific, when the Korean War erupted, and subsequently served in Korea as chief of staff, 1st Marine Division, earning a second Legion of Merit with Combat "V" and Air Medal.

From 1951 to 1955, Krulak served at Headquarters Marine Corps as Secretary of the General Staff, then rejoined Fleet Marine Force, Pacific, as chief of staff.

1956 to 1959
In July 1956, he was promoted to brigadier general and designated assistant commander, 3rd Marine Division on Okinawa. From 1957 to 1959, he served as director, Marine Corps Educational Center, Quantico. He was promoted to major general in November 1959, and the following month assumed command of the Marine Corps Recruit Depot, San Diego.

Vietnam War

From 1962 to 1964, Krulak served as special assistant for counter insurgency activities, Organization of the Joint Chiefs of Staff; for which he was presented a third Legion of Merit for exceptional meritorious service by General Maxwell D. Taylor, Chairman of the Joint Chiefs of Staff. During this period, American military advisors were providing assistance to the South Vietnamese in their war against the Viet Cong. In September 1963, then Major General Krulak and Joseph Mendenhall, a senior Foreign Service officer, led the Krulak–Mendenhall mission, a fact-finding mission to learn about the progress of the war. Krulak said that the situation was very good and supported President Ngo Dinh Diem, while Mendenhall claimed the opposite, leading Kennedy to famously ask the pair if they had visited the same country. In late December 1963, the new president, Lyndon B. Johnson, ordered an interdepartmental group to be headed by Krulak with the purpose of studying OPLAN 34A and selecting from it those targets the United States could hit in North Vietnam with the least amount of risk to its people. This was in keeping with the administration's policy of graduated pressure on the North Vietnamese.

On March 1, 1964, Krulak was designated Commanding General, Fleet Marine Force, Pacific, and promoted to lieutenant general. For the next four years, Krulak was responsible for all Fleet Marine Force units in the Pacific, including some 54 trips to the Vietnam theater. Many sources including Coram (2010) report that the Chu Lai base, which commenced in May 1965, was named after Krulak's own Chinese name.

At the beginning of the war, Krulak put forward the "Spreading Inkblot Theory." This promoted a spreading inkblot of small units actions to pacify South Vietnam village by village. When large enemy units were encountered then General Westmoreland's overwhelming firepower should be employed. He also called for intensive bombing of North Vietnam and mining of Haiphong Harbor. Krulak's plans were eventually rejected as Westmoreland favored hammering the enemy into submission through superior firepower and the Johnson administration feared relentless bombing of the North would provoke Soviet and Chinese intervention. Krulak opposed the establishment of the Khe Sanh Combat Base.

Krulak hoped to become the next Commandant of the Marine Corps, but in 1967 Lyndon B. Johnson selected Leonard F. Chapman, Jr.  As a result, Krulak retired on June 1, 1968, receiving a Navy Distinguished Service Medal for his performance during that period. His biographer Robert Coram states Krulak's comments to President Johnson criticizing the restraints placed on American military operations in Vietnam resulted in Johnson's selection of Chapman over Krulak. General Krulak's son Charles C. Krulak eventually became the 31st Commandant of the Marine Corps, serving from 1995 to 1999.

Medals and decorations
Krulak's medals and decorations include:

Strategic vehicle advocacy
Krulak was an early advocate of using helicopters for infantry assault. He was also instrumental in the development of Higgins boats, which enabled beach landings of men and material in World War II.

Post-military career
After retiring from the Marine Corps, Krulak worked for Copley Newspapers, including serving as president of Copley News Service and vice president of Copley Press.  He retired from Copley in 1977, though he continued to contribute to their news service.  Krulak also wrote a number of books, including the iconic Marine Corps history First to Fight.

Krulak was a personal friend of Ronald Reagan. They wrote each other regularly.

In retirement, Krulak was active in community organizations, as well as participating in Marine Corps activities.  He served as president and trustee of the Zoological Society of San Diego.  His wife, Amy, died in 2004.

On December 29, 2008, Lieutenant General Krulak died at age 95 in San Diego, California.  He was survived by his three sons – retired Marine Corps Commandant General Charles Krulak, Reverend Victor Krulak (Commander Navy Chaplain Corps), Reverend William Krulak (Colonel USMCR) – four grandchildren, and 10 great-grandchildren.  Krulak's funeral was held on January 8, 2009, in the chapel at MCAS Miramar, with burial at Fort Rosecrans National Cemetery.

Honors
In 2004, Lieutenant General Krulak was the recipient of the U.S. Naval Academy's Distinguished Graduate award, which honors alumni who have "provided a lifetime of service to the nation or armed forces, have made significant and distinguished contributions to the nation via their public service and have demonstrated a strong interest in supporting the Navy or Marine Corps and the United States Naval Academy. These individuals are the embodiment of the Naval Academy's mission to provide graduates who will be ready '…to assume the highest responsibilities of command, citizenship and government.'"

In 2007, at the Marine Corps Association's first annual banquet, Secretary of Defense Robert Gates recounted the story of Krulak's time in China and his career:

His book First to Fight won the 1984 Samuel Eliot Morison Award for Naval Literature.

The Brute Krulak Center for Innovation and Creativity (BKCIC) at the Marine Corps University is named after Victor Krulak.

Published works

References

Further reading
 
 Krulak, Victor H. (1983). Organization for National Security, Cambridge, Massachusetts: United States Strategic Institute. .
 Krulak, Victor H. (1984). First to Fight: An Inside View of the U.S. Marine Corps, Annapolis, Maryland: Naval Institute Press. . This book is on the Chief of Naval Operations' Professional Reading List and the Commandant of the Marine Corps' Reading List.

External links

 
 
 
 

1913 births
2008 deaths
United States Marine Corps personnel of World War II
United States Marine Corps personnel of the Korean War
United States Marine Corps personnel of the Vietnam War
Recipients of the Navy Cross (United States)
Writers from Denver
Military personnel from Colorado
Paramarines
United States Marine Corps generals
United States Naval Academy alumni
Burials at Fort Rosecrans National Cemetery
Jewish American military personnel

Recipients of the Air Medal
Recipients of the Navy Distinguished Service Medal
Recipients of the Legion of Merit
3 Krulak, Victor H.
Recipients of the Gallantry Cross (Vietnam)
20th-century American Jews
21st-century American Jews